The discography of Beth Orton, an English folktronica singer-songwriter, consists of eight studio albums, two compilation albums, three extended plays, twenty singles (including two promotional releases) and thirteen music videos. Orton debuted in 1993 as the singer of the duo Spill, a collaboration with William Orbit. The two released one single, a cover of John Martyn's song "Don't Wanna Know 'Bout Evil".

Orton's solo debut studio album, Superpinkymandy, was released in November 1993. Produced with Orbit, it was only released in Japan. Trailer Park, her second studio album, was released in 1996. It reached number sixty-eight on the United Kingdom albums chart and earned Orton two Brit Award nominations. Four singles, "I Wish I Never Saw the Sunshine", "She Cries Your Name", "Touch Me with Your Love" and "Someone's Daughter", were released from the album: "She Cries Your Name" peaked at number forty in the UK. The studio album Central Reservation followed in March 1999. It reached number seventeen in the UK and number thirty-five in New Zealand. Two singles were released from the album: "Stolen Car" and "Central Reservation", with both songs charting in the United States and the UK.

Orton worked extensively with producers Victor Van Vugt and Ben Watt in recording her fourth studio album, Daybreaker, which was released in July 2002. It peaked at number eight in the UK and number forty on the US Billboard 200 – it was certified silver by the British Phonographic Industry (BPI). The album produced four singles, "Concrete Sky", "Carmella", "Anywhere" and "Thinking About Tomorrow". Comfort of Strangers, her fifth studio album, followed in September 2006. It charted within the top 50 of the Australian and UK album charts. Three singles, "Conceived", "Shopping Trolley" and "Heart of Soul", were released from the album: "Conceived" reached number forty-four in the UK. Orton's sixth studio album, Sugaring Season, was released in October 2012. Produced by Tucker Martine, the album peaked at number twenty-six in the UK and number ninety on the US Billboard 200. Three singles were released from the album: "Something More Beautiful", "Magpie" and "Call Me the Breeze".

Albums

Studio albums

Compilation albums

Extended plays

Singles

As lead artist

Promotional singles

As a featured artist

Other appearances

Music videos

References

External links
 
 

Alternative rock discographies
Discographies of British artists
Electronic music discographies